Regererai "Regé-Jean" Page (born 27 April 1988) is an English-Zimbabwean actor. He appeared in several television series such as Waterloo Road (2015) on BBC One, Roots (2016) on History, and For the People (2018–2019) on ABC before rising to prominence for his role in the first season of the Netflix period drama Bridgerton (2020). He then appeared in the action film The Gray Man (2022), also on Netflix.

Early life and education
Regererai Page was born on 27 April 1988 in London, to an English preacher and a Zimbabwean nurse. He is the third of four children, and was once in a band with his brother. He spent his childhood in his mother's native Harare before returning to London for secondary school, where he took up acting as a hobby and studied sound engineering at the National Youth Theatre. After two years of auditioning, he enrolled at Drama Centre London.

Career 
Page's first acting role was in 2001 playing Tanaka in television series Gimme 6. This was followed by guest appearances in British television series Casualty@Holby City in 2005, Fresh Meat in 2013, and Waterloo Road in 2015. On stage, he had roles in theatre productions of The History Boys in 2013, and The Merchant of Venice in 2015. Page made his American production debut playing the role of Chicken George in the History Channel miniseries Roots in 2016, a remake of the 1977 miniseries with the same name which is based on Alex Haley's 1976 novel, Roots: The Saga of an American Family. The same year, Page filmed an unaired pilot episode for ABC's Spark.

In 2017, he was cast in a supporting role in the Shondaland-produced legal drama For the People which ran for two seasons, before getting cancelled by ABC in 2019. On film, he had a minor roles in the post-apocalyptic film Mortal Engines in 2018 and drama film Sylvie's Love in 2020.

In 2019, Page was cast as one of the leads in the first series of Netflix period drama Bridgerton, another Shondaland project. It is based on the Regency romance novel The Duke and I and was released in December 2020. The show was a critical success and Page received an NAACP Image Award for Outstanding Actor in a Drama Series presented by the National Association for the Advancement of Colored People, with Time magazine including him in their 100 Next List in 2021. He was also nominated for an Primetime Emmy for the role. Page did not return for the show's second series despite being offered to come back as he initially only signed a one-series deal, and wanted to explore other opportunities outside the show.

In 2022, Page appeared in Netflix's film The Gray Man which received mixed reviews. David Ehrlich of IndieWire described Page as "miserable in the role of a gallingly basic villain", with the BBC's Nicholas Barber calling his performance "one-dimensionally evil". He was also made the new face of Armani Code in 2022. 

Page has a part in the upcoming fantasy film Dungeons & Dragons: Honor Among Thieves (2023).

Personal life 
As of 2023, Page is in a relationship with Emily Brown. They were first linked in 2019, and made their first public appearance together in September 2021.

Filmography

Film

Television

Theatre

Audio

Awards and nominations

References

External links
 

Living people
21st-century English male actors
Alumni of the Drama Centre London
Black British male actors
English male film actors
English male television actors
English male voice actors
English people of Zimbabwean descent
Male actors from London
National Youth Theatre members
1988 births